Why Not Me? is a 1999 French comedy film written and directed by Stéphane Giusti. It is about a group of gay French friends living in Barcelona who decide to have a dinner party and come out to their parents.

Cast
 Amira Casar as Camille
 Julie Gayet as Eva
 Bruno Putzulu as Nico
 Alexandra London as Ariane
 Carmen Chaplin as Lili
 Johnny Hallyday as José
 Marie-France Pisier as Irene
 Brigitte Roüan as Josepha
 Assumpta Serna as Diane
 Elli Medeiros as Malou
 Vittoria Scognamiglio as Sara
 Jean-Claude Dauphin as Alain
 Joan Crosas as Tony
 Montse Mostaza as Tina
 Marta Gil as Clara
 Cedric Dupuy as Frenchie

Awards
In 1999, Why Not Me? won the Best Lesbian Feature at the Seattle Lesbian & Gay Film Festival. This was followed in 2000 with the Audience Award and the Jury Award at the 2000 Miami Gay and Lesbian Film Festival.

References

External links
 
 

1999 films
1999 comedy films
1990s French-language films
French LGBT-related films
French comedy films
Spanish comedy films
Spanish LGBT-related films
Films set in Barcelona
Swiss LGBT-related films
1999 LGBT-related films
French-language Swiss films
1990s French films